The Department of Informatics and Mathematical Modelling (IMM) is a research and educational center for embedded systems, system on chip systems, software modelling and language based security at the Technical University of Denmark in the Nordic region. It has more than 200 full-time scientists and engineers.

Technical University of Denmark